The 2010 Auto Club 500 was a NASCAR Sprint Cup Series race held on February 21, 2010 at Auto Club Speedway in Fontana, California. Contested over 250 laps, it was the second race of the 2010 Sprint Cup Series season. The race was won by Jimmie Johnson for Hendrick Motorsports. Kevin Harvick finished second and Jeff Burton clinched third.

Polesitter driver Jamie McMurray maintained his lead into the first corner, but outsider Juan Pablo Montoya took the lead before the first lap was over. Afterward, Johnson became the leader, and would eventually lead to the race-high of 101 laps. During the final pit stops, Johnson was on pit lane as the caution flag came out. Burton, who led the race during Johnson's pit stop, did not pass Johnson to put him a lap down. Therefore, Johnson retained the first position upon the completion of pit stops. On the final lap, Harvick was gaining on Johnson, but Johnson maintained his position to win his first race of the season.

There were six caution flags and 28 lead changes among 14 different drivers throughout the course of the race. The result moved Johnson up 23 spots to tenth in the Drivers' Championship, 78 points behind of leader Kevin Harvick and one ahead of Kyle Busch. Chevrolet maintained its lead in the Manufacturers' Championship, eight points ahead of Toyota and nine ahead of Ford, with 34 races remaining in the season.

Report

Background 
Auto Club Speedway is one of six superspeedways to hold NASCAR races; the others are Daytona International Speedway, Michigan International Speedway, Indianapolis Motor Speedway, Pocono Raceway and Talladega Superspeedway. The track's turns are banked at fourteen degrees, while the front stretch, the location of the finish line, is banked at eleven degrees. The back stretch has 3 degrees of banking.

Before the race, Jamie McMurray led the Drivers' Championship with 190 points, and Dale Earnhardt Jr. stood in second with 175 points. Greg Biffle was third in the Drivers' Championship with 170 points, Clint Bowyer was fourth with 165 points, and Kevin Harvick was in fifth with 156 points. In the Manufacturers' Championship, Chevrolet was leading with nine points, three points ahead of their rival Ford. Toyota, with four points, was one point ahead of Dodge in the battle for third.

Practices and qualifying 

Three practice sessions were held before the Sunday race—one on Friday, and two on Saturday. In the first practice session, the fastest drivers were Mark Martin, Ryan Newman, Juan Pablo Montoya, Jeff Burton, and Clint Bowyer. During the second practice session, Jimmie Johnson, Martin, Denny Hamlin, Carl Edwards, and Greg Biffle had the quickest times. Martin, Bowyer, Johnson, McMurray, and Jeff Gordon led the final practice session.

During qualifying, forty-six cars were entered, but only forty-three were able to race because of NASCAR's qualifying procedure. Jamie McMurray clinched the pole position with a best lap time of 39.185 seconds. He was joined on the front row of the grid by Montoya. Bowyer qualified third, Kasey Kahne took fourth, and Dave Blaney started fifth. Casey Mears, Johnny Sauter, and Terry Cook were the three drivers who failed to qualify.

Race summary 
The race, the second out of a total of thirty-six in the season, began at 3 p.m. EST and was televised live in the United States on Fox. Pre-race ceremonies began with Motor Racing Outreach's Jeff Hamilton giving the invocation; then Katharine McPhee, season five American Idol runner-up turned RCA Records recording artist, performed the national anthem. Actor Andy García gave the traditional command, "Gentlemen Start Your Engines!" Before the race, Denny Hamlin moved to the back of the starting grid because his team changed engines after his qualifying run. At 3:19 p.m. EST, polesitter Jamie McMurray led the 43-car field to the green flag, but his lead was short-lived. Juan Pablo Montoya passed him during the first lap to lead lap 1. On lap 29, Jimmie Johnson passed Montoya for the lead. Between laps 35 to 40 teams made green flag pit stops (a pit stop while high speed racing continues). Dave Blaney stayed out to lead before parking his car on lap 44, allowing Johnson to regain the lead.

On lap 57, the first caution period of the race was called because of debris on the track's surface. The restart on lap 61 was led by Johnson, but Kevin Harvick passed him for the lead before the lap was over. The second caution flag was waved on lap 92 because Kasey Kahne collided with Montoya. On lap 97, Johnson brought the field to the green flag. Mark Martin passed Johnson on lap 98, but was passed back after two laps. Drivers began heading for pit stops on lap 133. Then, on lap 140, the third caution came out because Montoya's engine failed, causing him to collide with the turn one wall. On lap 145, the green flag waved with Jeff Gordon as the leader.

The fourth caution, caused by the expired engine of Ryan Newman, came out on lap 147. On the restart, Gordon led the field to the green flag. He did not restart fast enough and was passed by both Jeff Burton and Kyle Busch on lap 154. On the next lap, Kyle Busch passed Burton for the lead. Ten laps after that, Burton returned the favor by passing Busch for the lead. During the following laps, several drivers made pit stops. The fifth caution flag was waved on lap 192 because light rain was moving through the area; the leader at the time was Denny Hamlin.

During the restart on lap 199, Burton brought the field to the green flag. No cautions were called until Brad Keselowski collided with the outside wall in turn four that brought out the sixth caution. The restart was on lap 229 with Jimmie Johnson as the leader. In the ensuing laps, Jimmie Johnson increased his lead over second-placed Kevin Harvick, but with fewer than ten laps to go Harvick began gaining on Johnson. Two laps before the finish, Burton caught up to Harvick and Johnson. Johnson held off both Harvick and Burton to win his first race in 2010.

Post-race 

Jimmie Johnson appeared in victory lane after his victory lap to start celebrating his first win of the season, his fifth at Auto Club Speedway, and his 48th overall in the NASCAR Sprint Cup Series. Following his win, he added, "No way around it, we got lucky. We were able to just beat the 31 car [leader Jeff Burton] to the scoring line by about half a car length or we would have been a lap down."

Although Burton was leading near the end of the race, the caution was issued as Johnson was exiting the pit lane. It gave Burton a chance to put Johnson a lap down, but Johnson entered the track ahead of Burton. In the subsequent press conference, Johnson said, "Fortunate came our way. I’m not going to lie. The fact that we were on pit row gave us track position, and I drove my butt off." Johnson expressed his enjoyment of winning the race, stating:

Burton, who finished third, stated, "We weren't slowing each other down. I ran the low line and Kevin ran the high line. But I got looser and Kevin got better at the end. The 29 by far had the best car." Harvick, who finished second, said, "When he moved up I got tight and caught the wall a little bit. If he doesn't move up, he gets passed pretty easily. He did what he's supposed to do to take the line away. He did exactly what he had to do." The race result left Harvick leading the Driver's Championship with a total of 331 points. Clint Bowyer, who finished third, was second with 312 points, eight ahead of Greg Biffle and ten ahead of Jamie McMurray. Jeff Burton stood in fifth with 300 points. In the Manufacturers' Championship, Chevrolet maintained their lead with 18 points. Toyota moved to second with 10 points. Ford followed with 9 points, two points ahead of Dodge in fourth.

Race results

Qualifying

Race results

Standings after the race 

Drivers' Championship standings

Manufacturers' Championship standings

Note: Only the top five positions are included for both sets of standings.

References 

Auto Club 500
Auto Club 500
NASCAR races at Auto Club Speedway
February 2010 sports events in the United States